Walter Moore (born September 1, 1984) is a Guyanese professional footballer who plays as a left-back and left midfielder for Ykkönen club FF Jaro and the Guyana national team. He is the Guyana national team's most-capped footballer.

Club career
Moore has played extensively in Trinidad and Tobago TT Pro League, for North East Stars and Caledonia AIA. He was part of the Caledonia team which won both the Trinidad and Tobago Cup and the Trinidad and Tobago Pro Bowl in 2008.

Moore was loaned by Caledonia AIA to Charlotte Eagles of the USL Pro league in April 2011.

Moore left FC Astana-1964 during the summer of 2014.

In March 2015, Moore moved to Finland, signing a two-year contract with FF Jaro. In 2018, Moore left Jaro for AC Oulu. In 2019, he returned to FF Jaro.

International career
Moore has played left back for the Guyana national football team since 2004. He scored his first international goal on October 13, 2010 in a 2010 Caribbean Championship game against the Netherlands Antilles. Moore retired from international football in October 2016. But he did make a return to the squad; on 13 October, he made a start against Turks and Caicos Islands in the CONCOCAF Nations League Qualifying and they defeated them 8-0 in Providenciales.

Career statistics

International

Statistics accurate as of match played 16 March 2019

International goals
Scores and results list Guyana's goal tally first.

References

External links

1984 births
Living people
Guyanese footballers
Guyana international footballers
Alpha United FC players
North East Stars F.C. players
Guyanese expatriate sportspeople in Trinidad and Tobago
TT Pro League players
Morvant Caledonia United players
Charlotte Eagles players
Expatriate footballers in Trinidad and Tobago
Expatriate soccer players in the United States
Expatriate footballers in Finland
Expatriate footballers in Kazakhstan
USL Championship players
FF Jaro players
FC Zhenis Astana players
FC Vostok players
Association football midfielders
Association football defenders
Afro-Guyanese people